Pânceşti or Pănceşti may refer to several places in Romania:

 Pâncești, Bacău, a commune in Bacău County
 Pâncești, Neamț, a commune in Neamţ County
 Pănceşti, a village in Sascut Commune, Bacău County